Ferdinand de Villeneuve (5 June 1801 – 27 September 1858) was a 19th-century French playwright.

Short biography 
He made his debut in the theatre at the age of 21 by partnering with Charles Dupeuty, and began to be successful from 1823 onwards. In 1825, he founded the newspaper La Nouveauté with Dupeuty, Amable de Saint-Hilaire and Musnier Desclozeaux, a publication which became a daily.

Co-director of the Théâtre de la Porte-Saint-Martin with Anténor Joly from December 1835, he then directed, still with Joly, the Théâtre de la Renaissance in 1838 with its own funds.

His plays were presented on several 19th-century Parisian stages, including the Théâtre des Folies-Dramatiques, the Théâtre du Palais-Royal, the Théâtre du Vaudeville, and the Théâtre des Variétés.

The painter and photographer Julien Vallou de Villeneuve was his brother.

Works 

1822: L'Arracheur de dents, one-act folie-parade, mingled with couplets, with Charles Dupeuty
1822: Fille et garçon, ou la Petite orpheline, one-act comédie-vaudeville, with Dupeuty
1822: Le Premier prix, ou les Deux artistes, comédie-vaudeville in 1 act, with Dupeuty
1823: L'Actrice, comédie-vaudeville in 1 act, with Dupeuty
1823: Mon ami Christophe, comédie-vaudeville in 1 act, with Dupeuty and W. Lafontaine
1823: Le Oui des jeunes filles, comédie-vaudeville in 1 act, imitée de l'espagnol, with Jouslin de La Salle
1823: Le Sergent de Chevert, vaudeville historique in 1 act, with Dupeuty
1824: Les Acteurs à l'essai, comédie-vaudeville-épisodique in 1 act, with Dupeuty
1824: Léonide ou La Vieille de Suresne, comédie vaudeville in 3 acts, with Dupeuty and Amable de Saint-Hilaire
1824: Les Modistes, tableau-vaudeville in 1 act, with Charles-Gaspard Delestre-Poirson and Dupeuty
1824: Ourika ou la Négresse, drama in 1 act, with Dupeuty
1824: La Petite somnambule, comédie-vaudeville un 1 act, with Dupeuty
1824: Pierre et Marie, ou le Soldat ménétrier, comédie-vaudeville in 1 act, with Dupeuty and Langlé
1824: Le Tableau de Téniers, ou l'Artiste et l'ouvrier, vaudeville un 1 act, with Dupeuty and Maurice Alhoy
1824: Un jour à Dieppe, à-propos-vaudeville, with Saint-Hilaire, Dupeuty and Langlé
1825: Alice, ou les Six promesses, vaudeville un 1 act, with Dupeuty and Saint-Hilaire
1825: Les Deux tailleurs, ou la Fourniture et la façon, comédie-vaudeville in 1 act, with Dupeuty and Jouslin de La Salle
1825: Nicaise, ou le Jour des noces, comédie-vaudeville un 1 act, with Dupeuty
1826: L'Anonyme, comédie-vaudeville in 2 acts, with Dupeuty and Jouslin de La Salle
1826: La Dette d'honneur, comédie vaudeville in 2 acts, with Dupeuty and Langlé
1826: Le Soldat en retraite, ou les Coups du sort, drama in 2 acts, with Jouslin de La Salle and Dupeuty
1826: Le Vieux pauvre, ou le Bal et l'incendie, melodrama in 3 acts and extravaganza, with Dupeuty and Ferdinand Laloue
1827: Gérard et Marie, comédie vaudeville in 1 act, with Étienne Arago
1827: Le Hussard de Felsheim, comédie-vaudeville in 3 acts, with Saint-Hilaire and Dupeuty
1827: La Fleuriste, comédie-vaudeville in 1 act, with Étienne Arago
1827: Monsieur Botte, comédie-vaudeville in 3 acts, with Dupeuty
1828: La Grande duchesse, comédie-vaudeville in 1 act, with Dupeuty and Saintine
1828: Les Poletais, comédie-vaudeville in 2 parts, with Saintine and Dupeuty
1828: L'Art de se faire aimer de son mari, comédie-vaudeville in 3 acts, with Saintine and Dupeuty
1828 Les dix francs de Jeannette, with Armand-François Jouslin de La Salle
1828: L'Enfant et le vieux garçon, ou la Réputation d'une femme, comédie en vaudevilles in 1 act, with Armand Desvergers and Charles Varin
1828: Guillaume Tell, drame-vaudeville in 3 acts, with Dupeuty and Saintine
1828: Henri IV en famille, comédie-vaudeville un 1 act, with Auguste Pittaud de Forges and Louis-Émile Vanderburch
1828: Le Pauvre Arondel, ou les Trois Talismans, vaudeville-féerie in 2 acts, with Arago
1828: Le Sergent Mathieu, comédie-vaudeville in 3 acts, with Saintine and Dupeuty
1828: Valentine, ou la Chute des feuilles, drama in 2 acts, mingled with songs, with Saint-Hilaire
1828: Yelva ou L'orpheline russe, vaudeville in 2 parts, with Desvergers and Eugène Scribe
1829: La jeunesse de Marie Stuart, drama in 2 parts, with Vanderburch
1829: La Maison du faubourg, comédie-vaudeville in 2 acts, with Vanderburch
1829: Le Mariage par autorité de justice, comedy in 2 acts, with Antoine Simonnin
1829: Mathieu Laensberg, comédie-vaudeville in 2 acts, with Bourgeois and Vanderburch
1829: La Paysanne de Livonie, comédie historique in 2 acts, mingled with songs, with Saintine and Vanderburch
1830: À-propos patriotique, with Michel Masson
1830: Le Congréganiste, ou les Trois éducations, comédie-vaudeville in 3 acts, with Auguste Anicet-Bourgeois
1830: Le Collège de *** [Reichenau], souvenirs de la Suisse, en 1794, comédie-vaudeville, with Adolphe de Leuven and Masson
1830: Le Marchand de la rue Saint-Denis, ou le Magasin, la mairie et la cour d'assises, comédie-vaudeville in 3 acts, with Brazier
1830: Le Moulin de Jemmapes, vaudeville historique in 1 act, with de Leuven and Masson
1831: L'audience du Prince, comédie-vaudeville in 1 act, with Anicet Bourgeois and Charles de Livry
1831: Angélique et Jeanneton, comédie-vaudeville in 4 acts, with Dupeuty and Saintine
1831: Les Bouillons à domicile, revue-vaudeville in 1 act, with de Lurieu and de Livry
1831: La Caricature, ou les Croquis à la mode, album en sept pochades, with de Lurieu and de Livry
1831: L'Entrevue, ou les Deux impératrices, comédie-vaudeville in 1 act, with Masson and Saintine
1831: La Jardinière de l'Orangerie, comédie-vaudeville in 1 act, with Masson
1831: Les Pilules dramatiques, ou le Choléra-morbus, revue critique et politique in 1 act
1831: Robert-le-Diable, à-propos-vaudeville, with Saintine
1831: Le Secret d'état, comédie-vaudeville in 1 act, with Eugène Sue and Édouard Magnien
1831: La Vieillesse de Stanislas, drame-vaudeville in 1 act, with Saint-Hilaire and Masson
1832: La ferme de Bondi, ou Les deux réfractaires, episode de l'Empire in 4 acts, with de Lurieu and Masson
1832: Le Bateau de blanchisseuses, tableau-vaudeville in 1 act, with Masson and de Livry
1832 La Chanteuse et l'ouvrière, comédie-vaudeville in 4 acts, with Saintine
1832: Sara, ou l'Invasion, conte allemand in 2 acts, mingled with vaudeville, with de Leuven and Masson
1833: La Révolte des femmes, vaudeville in 2 acts, with de Livry
1833: Santeul ou Le chanoine au cabaret, vaudeville in 1 act, with Brazier and Léon Lévy Brunswick
1833: Les Deux frères, comedy by Kotzebue, translated by Patrat, remise in 2 acts and in vaudeville, with Masson
1833: La fille de Dominique, comédie vaudeville in 1 act, with de Livry
1833: Les Locataires et les portiers, vaudeville in 1 act, with Brazier and de Livry
1834: Le Triolet bleu, comédie-vaudeville in 5 acts, with de Lurieu and Masson
1834: Lionel, ou Mon avenir, comédie-vaudeville in 2 acts, with de Livry
1834: Un bal de domestiques, vaudeville in 1 act, with de Livry
1835: Micheline, ou L'heure de l'esprit, opéra comique in 1 act, with Masson and Saint-Hilaire
1835: Les infidélités de Lisette, drame vaudeville in 5 acts, with Nicolas Brazier and de Livry
1835: On ne passe pas ! ou le Poste d'honneur, vaudeville in 1 act, with Masson
1835: Le Ménage du savetier, ou la Richesse du pauvre, comédie-vaudeville in 1 act, with Jouslin de La Salle
1835: Micheline, ou L'heure de l'esprit, opéra comique in 1 act, with Masson and Saint-Hilaire
1836: La Grue, fabliau mêlé de chant, with Charles Rondeau and de Livry
1837: La Résurrection de Saint Antoine, à propos-vaudeville in 1 act, with Emmanuel Théaulon and Brazier
1837: Le Mémoire de la blanchisseuse, comedy in 1 act, mingled with couplets, with Brazier and de Livry
1838: Mademoiselle Dangeville, comédie in 1 act, mingled with song, with de Livry
1838: L'enfant de la balle, vaudeville in 2 acts, with Didier
1839: Rendez donc service, comédie proverbe in 1 act, with Masson
1840: Cocorico ou La poule à ma tante, vaudeville in 5 acts, with Masson and Saint-Yves
1840: Les pages de Louis XII, comedy in 2 acts, with Alexandre Barrière
1840: Le Mari de la fauvette, opéra comique in 1 act, with Angel and Veyrat
1840: Les marins d'eau douce, vaudeville in 1 act, with Angel and Veyrat
1840: Tout pour les filles rien pour les garçons, vaudeville in 2 acts, with de Lurieu
1841: Voltaire en vacances, comédie vaudeville in 2 acts, with de Livry
1842: Au croissant d'argent, comédie-vaudeville in 2 acts, with Hippolyte Le Roux
1842: Un bas bleu, vaudeville in 1 act, with Ferdinand Langlé
1842: Les batignollaises, vaudeville grivois in 1 act, with de Lurieu
1842: Jaket's club, vaudeville in 2 acts, with Ernest Jaime
1844: Pulcinella, comédie-vaudeville in 2 acts, with Adolphe d'Ennery
1845: L'almanach des  adresses, comédie-vaudeville in 3 acts, with Édouard Lafargue
1845: La Morale en action, comédie-vaudeville in 1 act, with Jaime
1846: Jean-Baptiste, ou Un cœur d'or, drama in 5 acts, mingled with songs, with Masson and Frédéric Thomas
1846: L'inconnue de Ville-d'Avray, comédie-vaudeville in 1 act, with Angel
1847: L'Homme aux 160 millions, comédie-vaudeville in 2 acts, with Angel and Xavier Veyrat
1849: Lorettes et aristos ou Une soirée au Ranelagh, tableau-vaudeville in 1 act, with Paul Siraudin
1850: Un fantôme, comédie-vaudeville in 1 act, with Lafargue
1850: Jean Bart, pièce historique in 5 acts, with Forges
1854: La Femme à trois maris, comédie-vaudeville in 1 act
1854: Une sangsue, comédie vaudeville in 1 act, with Langlé
1855: Bonaparte à l'École de Brienne, play in 3 acts and 4 tableaux, with Gabriel de Lurieu and Michel Masson
1855: Deux vieilles gardes, opéra bouffe in 1 act, with Léo Delibes

References

Bibliography 
 Joseph Marie Quérard, La France Litteraire, T.X, 1839,  (Read on line) 
 Joseph Fr. Michaud, Louis Gabriel Michaud, Biographie universelle ancienne et moderne, vol.43, 1843, 
 Louis Gustave Vapereau, Dictionnaire universel des contemporains, 1870, 

19th-century French dramatists and playwrights
1801 births
1858 deaths
Burials at Père Lachaise Cemetery